Nubeena is a town and fishing village on the Tasman Peninsula, Tasmania, Australia a township of Tasman Council, and seat of the municipality. At the 2016 census, Nubeena had a population of 481. It is the largest settlement on the peninsula.

Media
Nubeena is served by 97.7 Tasman FM and Pulse FM Tasman which is run by the JNET Radio Network.

Geography
The town is halfway along the west coast of Tasman Peninsula, on Parsons Bay, which is a narrow continuation of Wedge Bay.

History
Nubeena Post Office opened on 1 December 1886. The first postmaster was Joseph Thornton (1813-1899) who carried the mail between Wedge Bay to Premaydena, then Impression Bay.

The town possesses a police station and a branch of the Country Women's Association.

References

See also
 

Towns in Tasmania
Localities of Tasman Council